The Greenlaw Addition Historic District, in Memphis, Tennessee, is a historic district which was listed on the National Register of Historic Places in 1984.  It included 260 contributing buildings and 76 buildings deemed not to be contributing to its historic character.

Most of the buildings were constructed between 1885 and 1915.

It has a few large residences but most are modest one-story houses, including a concentration of shotgun houses".  Various architectural styles are represented, including elements of Greek Revival, Gothic Revival, Italianate, Eastlake, Queen Anne, Romanesque, Colonial Revival, Four Square, Bungalow, and Mission" styles.  Some commercial buildings, mostly neighborhood corner stores, are included.

The district is roughly bounded by Bethel, Thomas, 7th, Auction, and 2nd Sts. in Memphis.

It includes the George C. Love House, which is separately listed on the National Register.

References

Shotgun architecture in Tennessee
National Register of Historic Places in Shelby County, Tennessee
Historic districts on the National Register of Historic Places in Tennessee
Victorian architecture in Tennessee

Buildings and structures completed in 1850